The Radiant Seas is a novel from the Saga of the Skolian Empire series of books by Catherine Asaro. The book continues where Primary Inversion ended and centers on the story of the devastating interstellar Radiance War.  It won the HOMer Award for Best Novel of 2000 from the SF and Fantasy forum on CompuServe.

Radiant Seas follows the lives of several Ruby Dynasty members (especially Sauscony (Soz), Kurj and Althor) and also of main political figures from the Eubian Concord (emperor Ur Qox and his wife Viquara) during a period of nearly 18 years.

Plot
Kurj has to deal not only with the shocking sudden death of Soz, whom he imagined as his successor, but also with the political intrigues of the Eubian emperor Ur Qox, who draws the Allieds on his side, using lies and dirty tricks. When Ur tries to take Kurj prisoner, this leads to the destruction of a part of his fleet and to the death of both Ur and Kurj, leaving their two empires presumably heirless.

Soz's brother Althor inherits her position of the imperial heir after her apparent death. When he learns that his sister is alive, he promises his father Eldrinson to keep the secret for himself. But later he is captured by the Eubians during a space battle and unwillingly reveals this information after a brutal torture. The widowed empress Viquara sees an opportunity to provide the Eubian Concord with an heir without losing her political power.

Sauscony abandons her life as a Jagernaut, fakes her own death, and elopes with Jaibriol Qox, the heir to the Eubian Concord. They relocate, with help, to an Allied-discovered, unknown planet which they call Prism. They have four children and live a relatively quiet life, though they know that someday they will most probably have return to their warring civilizations. Their children are heirs to both the Skolian Empire and the Eubian Concord.

Then Jaibriol is kidnapped by Viquara's soldiers and forced to act as a "puppet emperor" with Viquara and her new husband Quaelen wielding the power from behind the throne. Soz hides her children on Earth in the custody of former family member Seth Rockworth (once married to Dehya as part of the Icelandic Accord) and returns to Skolia to assume her rightful position as the new Imperator. In order to get her husband back and save her people from the power-hungry Aristo caste of Eube, she launches an attack that will become known as  the Radiance War.

References 

Saga of the Skolian Empire
Novels by Catherine Asaro
1999 American novels
Tor Books books